Dowell is a small, rural unincorporated community in Calvert County, Maryland, United States, located immediately north of Solomons. While many people  consider Dowell to be a part of Solomons, it maintains its own zip code, 20629.

Unincorporated communities in Calvert County, Maryland
Unincorporated communities in Maryland